Detective Josephine Danville is a fictional character and the co-protagonist of the CBS crime drama CSI: NY, portrayed by Sela Ward.

Background
Jo Danville joins the team as the new Assistant Supervisor, replacing Stella Bonasera. She comes from Virginia, where she worked for the FBI. Her field of expertise is DNA evidence, and her moral standpoint is that everyone is innocent until the science proves otherwise. She also has a background in criminal psychology, which makes her very effective at getting under the skin of potential suspects when she questions them.

While working in the FBI's crime lab in Washington D.C., she discovered a long-time respected lab technician had covered up evidence of a mistake he made for a case. Jo brought this to the attention of the defense attorneys, costing her support in the city and pushing her to move.

Upon her arrival at the crime lab, she walks into the empty lab (because everyone's attending Lindsay Monroe's medal presentation) and finds a dead body.

Her badge number is 8278.

Family
She has an ex-husband, FBI Agent Russ Josephson (David James Elliott). She has one son, Tyler (Cody Longo), and one adopted daughter, Ellie (Sydney Park). It is made clear that she adopted Ellie after her divorce.  In Episode "Nine Thirteen", Jo met a young man who claimed to have received her sister Leanne's donor heart.  It was later revealed Leanne was killed by a drunk driver.

Relationships
She has a very good working relationship with Mac Taylor, and he treats her like an equal, as opposed to his Assistant Supervisor. In the season 7 premiere, she meets Taylor and the rest of the team in the lab after finding the dead body of a woman on her arrival to the lab.

She has revealed that she is a fan of the Alabama Crimson Tide college football team during a case involving stolen jewelry (in real life, actress Sela Ward's alma mater is the University of Alabama); and once worked for a burlesque club at college, but only as an accountant, much to the intrigue and later the disappointment of Mac. She also, like her predecessor Stella Bonasera, often shows concern for Mac, as in the episode "Nothing for Something" when she notices that Mac had been wearing the same suit three days running.

References

CSI: NY characters
Fictional New York City Police Department detectives
Fictional Federal Bureau of Investigation personnel
Fictional forensic scientists
Fictional female scientists
Fictional characters from Virginia
Television characters introduced in 2010